= Caroline Pines, Virginia =

Unincorporated community in Virginia, United States

Coordinates: 37°53′47″N 77°26′09″W

Caroline Pines is an unincorporated community in Caroline County, in the U.S. state of Virginia.
